2-Chloropropylene is an organochlorine compound with the formula CH2=C(Cl)CH3.  It is a colorless gas that condenses just below room temperature.  Unlike the closely related vinyl chloride, which is a major industrial chemical, 2-chloropropene has no commercial applications and is a lightly studied compound.  In the research laboratory, it is used as a source of the 2-propenyl group.  One early synthesis involves dehydrohalogenation of 1,2-dichloropropane with potassium hydroxide.

References

Chloroalkenes